Pohorelá is a village and municipality in the Brezno District, of the Banská Bystrica Region of central Slovakia. It is located in the foothills of the Low Tatras range of the Carpathian Mountains, on the right bank of the upper Hron River. The village is located 33 km east of Brezno, 49 km southwest of Poprad, and 37 km north of Tisovec on First Class Road 66. Pohorelá is the third largest village of the Horehronie region. The Roman Catholic Pohorela church, built in 1762, is a dominant feature of the village. The village was known as Garamkohó for a time in the early 20th century.

Pohorelá is located in the heart of the ethnographic area known as Horehronie, which is known for its natural beauty and traditional folk culture. Despite this, Pohorelá is a Goral inhabited village. Pohorelá hosts the World Scything Championship every summer.

Topography
Pohorelá lies on the right bank of the Hron, on the edge of the Low Tatras.  On the left bank of the Hron, the Vepor Mountains rise steeply, forming a subrange of the Slovak Ore Mountains; the area is part of the Muránska Planina National Park. The entire right bank of the Hron is part of the protection zone of the Low Tatras National Park.

Important geographical points in the vicinity of the village are Ždiar Saddle, Orlová Peak, Andrejcová Hill, Mašianske skalky nature reserve and the Pohorelá uplands. At the upper end of the village are mineral water springs.

History
A long distance road between the Spiš and Horehronie regions has passed through the Hron valley since antiquity. A rare archaeological finding of a barbarian hoard from the Early Iron Age (Balas 1960,70) was found within the town limits - probably an excavation of the Puchov culture. The Horehronie region, along with the rest of what was to become modern Slovakia, became a part of the Kingdom of Hungary around 1000 AD. The village was founded at the beginning of the seventeenth century under the Vlach law, on the estate lands of Muráň Castle. The oldest written mention of the village dates back to 1612. The indigenous people of the region engaged in shepherding and forestry.

In the eighteenth century, iron ore mines were opened and the ironworks were built. The construction of houses for workers of the Pohorelá ironworks established the current neighboring settlement of Pohorelská Maša. In about 1830, ownership of the ironworks passed to Prince Ferdinand of Saxe-Coburg and Gotha, and the administration was moved to Pohorelá. After extensive modernization, the Pohorelá complex became the most important iron producer in what was then the Hungarian county of Gömör és Kishont. By 1844, the industrial complex along the Hron River consisted of 2 smelters, 15 forges, 3 sheet rolling mills, and 2 iron bar rolling mills.

From 1867, the area was part of the Hungarian half of the Austro-Hungarian Empire. The independence of Czecho-Slovakia was first announced in Pohorelá on about the 30th of October, 1918. Though a civic guard was formed, the village experienced some instability over the following first months of independence. The first elections for the National Assembly took place in April 1920, with the Slovak National Party winning the majority of votes in the village.

During the Slovak National Uprising (SNP), partisans of the Katrušinov section of the Jánošík Brigade - named for the 18th century Slovak highwayman, Juraj Jánošík - were active in the vicinity of Pohorelá. The village was occupied by German and Hungarian troops in late 1944. The Romanian army liberated Pohorelá on January 29, 1945.

The Velvet Revolution came to the area when a local chapter of the Public Against Violence(VPN) was formed in the village in early December 1989.

Demographics
According to data from the Statistical Office of the Slovak Republic, as of December 31, 2012, the village was inhabited by 2,293 people, including 1,225 women and 1,068 men.

In 2001, the distribution of the population by nationality and ethnicity was as follows:
 Slovaks – 99.36%
 Czechs – 0.11%
 Gypsies – 0.22%
 Ukrainians – 0.04%

The religious demographics were as follows in 2001:
 Roman Catholic – 95.03%
 Byzantine Catholic – 1.49%
 Lutheran – 0.26%
 Eastern Orthodox – 0.3%
 Atheist – 1.91%
 Not stated – 0.78%

Politics & Government
The village of Pohorelá is an independent territorial self-governing and administrative unit of the Slovak Republic. The branches of the municipal government are the Mayor and the Municipal Assembly. The Pohorelá Municipal Assembly consists of 9 deputies elected by the inhabitants of the municipality for a period of 4 years. The term of office of the deputies ends with the taking of the oath by the deputies of the newly elected municipal council.

The Mayor of Pohorelá is the head of the executive branch of the municipality, and is elected to serve a four-year term. Jana Tkáčiková (Ind.) is the incumbent.

Notable residents
 Vladimír Clementis, frequent visitor, Communist politician, Foreign Minister of Czecho-Slovakia 1948-1950
 Pavol Dobšinský, Slovak folklorist and author of the Romantic era
 Jozef Gregor-Tajovský, prose and drama author, novelist, playwright, poet, teacher and politician; leading figure of the second wave of Slovak literary realism, lived and worked in Pohorelá as a teacher in the 1890's
 Martin Rázus, poet, dramatist, writer, politician, and Lutheran priest
 Prince August of Saxe-Coburg and Gotha, ran Pohorelá ironworks
 Prince Ferdinand of Saxe-Coburg and Gotha, owned and modernized Pohorelá ironworks
 Ferdinand I of Bulgaria, maintained a summer residence in Pohorelská Maša
 Prince Philipp of Saxe-Coburg and Gotha, visited frequently on hunting trips
 Max Švabinský, painter, draughtsman, graphic artist, and professor

Picture gallery

Climate
The climate in this area is characterized by warm summers and generally cold winters.  According to the Köppen climate classification system, the Pohorelá area has a humid continental climate, abbreviated "Dfb" on climate maps.

References

External links
 Official website Pohorelá
 Official website of parish Pohorelá
 Pohorelá - History
 Banskobystrický samosprávny kraj Official website of the Banská Bystrica region
 HK Pohorelá
  Official Facebook page for HK Pohorelá

Villages and municipalities in Brezno District